Electoral history of Robert Byrd, senior United States senator from West Virginia (1959–2010), president pro tempore of the United States Senate (1989–1995, 2001, 2001–2003 and 2007–2010), Senate majority (1977–1981, 1987–1989) and minority leader (1981–1987). He was also the longest-serving U.S. senator in history, as well as the previous longest-serving member of Congress.

U.S. House elections
West Virginia's 6th congressional district, 1952:
 Robert Byrd (D) - 104,387 (55.58%)
 Latelle M. LaFollette Jr. (R) - 83,439 (44.42%)

West Virginia's 6th congressional district, 1954:
 Robert Byrd (D) (inc.) - 73,535 (62.73%)
 Pat B. Withrow, Jr. (R) - 43,685 (37.27%)

West Virginia's 6th congressional district, 1956:
 Robert Byrd (D) (inc.) - 99,854 (57.40%)
 Cleo S. Jones (R) - 74,110 (42.60%)

U.S. Senate elections
West Virginia United States Senate election, 1958:
 Robert Byrd (D) - 381,745 (59.19%)
 W. Chapman Revercomb (R) (inc.) - 263,172 (40.81%)

West Virginia United States Senate election, 1964:
 Robert Byrd (D) (inc.) - 515,015 (67.67%)
 Cooper P. Benedict (R) - 246,072 (32.33%)

West Virginia Democratic primary for the United States Senate, 1970:
 Robert Byrd (D) (inc.) - 195,725 (88.96%)
 John J. McOwen - 24,286 (11.04%)

West Virginia United States Senate election, 1970:
 Robert Byrd (D) (inc.) - 345,965 (77.64%)
 Elmer Dodson (R) - 99,658 (22.36%)

West Virginia United States Senate elections, 1976:
 Robert Byrd (D) (inc.) - 566,359 (100.00%)

West Virginia United States Senate election, 1982:
 Robert Byrd (D) (inc.) - 387,170 (68.49%)
 Cleve Benedict (R) - 173,910 (30.76%)
 William B. Howland (Socialist Workers) - 4,234 (0.75%)

West Virginia Democratic primary for the United States Senate, 1988:
 Robert Byrd (D) (inc.) - 252,767 (80.77%)
 Bob Myers - 60,186 (19.23%)

West Virginia United States Senate election, 1988:
 Robert Byrd (D) (inc.) - 410,983 (64.77%)
 Jay Wolfe (R) - 223,564 (35.23%)

West Virginia Democratic primary for the United States Senate, 1994:
 Robert Byrd (D) (inc.) - 190,061 (85.42%)
 James M. Fuller - 20,057 (9.01%)
 Paul Nuchims - 12,381 (5.57%)

West Virginia United States Senate election, 1994:
 Robert Byrd (D) (inc.) - 290,495 (69.01%)
 Stan Klos (R) - 130,441 (30.99%)

West Virginia United States Senate election, 2000:
 Robert Byrd (D) (inc.) - 469,215 (77.75%)
 David T. Gallaher (R) - 121,635 (20.16%)
 Joe Whelan (LBT) - 12,627 (2.09%)

West Virginia Democratic primary for the United States Senate, 2006:
 Robert Byrd (D) (inc.) - 159,154 (85.68%)
 Billy Hendricks Jr. - 26,609 (14.32%)

West Virginia United States Senate election, 2006:
 Robert Byrd (D) (inc.) - 291,058 (64.41%)
 John Raese (R) - 152,315 (33.71%)
 Jesse Johnson (Mountain) - 8,522 (1.89%)

Pro tempore elections
President pro tempore of the United States Senate, 1989:
 Robert Byrd (D) - 55 (55.00%)
 Strom Thurmond - 45 (45.00%)

President pro tempore of the United States Senate, 1991:
 Robert Byrd (D) (inc.) - 56 (56.00%)
 Strom Thurmond (R) - 44 (44.00%)

President pro tempore of the United States Senate, 1993:
 Robert Byrd (D) (inc.) - 57 (57.00%)
 Strom Thurmond (R) - 43 (43.00%)

President pro tempore of the United States Senate, 1995:
 Strom Thurmond (R) - 52 (52.00%)
 Robert Byrd (D) (inc.) - 48 (48.00%)

President pro tempore of the United States Senate, 1997:
 Strom Thurmond (R) (inc.) - 55 (55.00%)
 Robert Byrd - 45 (45.00%)

President pro tempore of the United States Senate, 1999:
 Strom Thurmond (R) (inc.) - 55 (55.00%)
 Robert Byrd - 45 (45.00%)

President pro tempore of the United States Senate, January 3, 2001:
 Robert Byrd (D) - 51 (50.50%)
 Strom Thurmond (R) (inc.) - 50 (49.51%)

Vice President Al Gore cast tie-breaking vote

President pro tempore of the United States Senate, January 20, 2001:
 Strom Thurmond (R) - 51 (50.50%)
 Robert Byrd (D) (inc.) - 50 (49.51%)

Vice President Dick Cheney cast tie-breaking vote

President pro tempore of the United States Senate, June 6, 2001:
 Robert Byrd (D) - 51 (51.00%)
 Strom Thurmond (R) (inc.) - 49 (49.00%)

President pro tempore of the United States Senate, 2003:
 Ted Stevens (R) - 51 (51.00%)
 Robert Byrd (D) (inc.) - 49 (49.00%)

President pro tempore of the United States Senate, 2005:
 Ted Stevens (R) (inc.) - 55 (55.00%)
 Robert Byrd - 45 (45.00%)

President pro tempore of the United States Senate, 2007:
 Robert Byrd (D) - 51 (51.00%)
 Ted Stevens (R) (inc.) - 49 (49.00%)

President pro tempore of the United States Senate, 2009:
 Robert Byrd (D) (inc.) - 58 (58.59%)
 Richard Lugar (R) - 41 (41.41%)

Presidential elections
West Virginia Democratic Presidential primary, 1976:
 Robert Byrd - 331,639 (89.01%)
 George Wallace - 40,938 (10.99%)

Florida Democratic Presidential primary, 1976:
 Jimmy Carter - 448,844 (34.52%)
 George Wallace - 396,820 (30.52%)
 Henry M. Jackson - 310,944 (23.91%)
 None of Names Shown - 37,626 (2.89%)
 Milton Shapp - 32,198 (2.48%)
 Mo Udall - 27,235 (2.09%)
 Birch Bayh - 8,750 (0.67%)
 Arthur O. Blessitt - 7,889 (0.61%)
 Ellen McCormack - 7,595 (0.58%)
 Sargent Shriver - 7,084 (0.55%)
 Fred R. Harris - 5,397 (0.42%)
 Robert Byrd - 5,042 (0.39%)
 Frank Church - 4,906 (0.38%)

Georgia Democratic Presidential primary, 1976:
 Jimmy Carter - 419,272 (83.44%)
 George Wallace - 57,594 (11.46%)
 Mo Udall - 9,755 (1.94%)
 Robert Byrd - 3,628 (0.72%)
 Henry M. Jackson - 3,358 (0.67%)
 Frank Church - 2,477 (0.49%)
 Frank Joseph Ahern - 1,487 (0.30%)
 Sargent Shriver - 1,378 (0.27%)
 Birch Bayh - 824 (0.16%)
 Fred R. Harris - 699 (0.14%)
 Ellen McCormack - 635 (0.13%)
 Abram Eisenman - 351 (0.07%)
 Lloyd Bentsen - 277 (0.06%)
 Frank Bona - 263 (0.05%)
 Milton Shapp - 181 (0.04%)
 George Roden - 153 (0.03%)
 Bob Kelleher - 139 (0.03%)

1976 Democratic Presidential primaries:
 Jimmy Carter - 6,235,609 (39.19%)
 Jerry Brown - 2,449,374 (15.39%)
 George Wallace - 1,955,388 (12.29%)
 Mo Udall - 1,611,754 (10.13%)
 Henry M. Jackson - 1,134,375 (7.13%)
 Frank Church - 830,818 (5.22%)
 Robert Byrd - 340,309 (2.14%)
 Sargent Shriver - 304,399 (1.91%)
 Unpledged delegates - 283,437 (1.78%)
 Ellen McCormack - 238,027 (1.50%)
 Fred R. Harris - 234,568 (1.47%)
 Milton Shapp - 88,254 (0.56%)
 Birch Bayh - 86,438 (0.54%)
 Hubert Humphrey - 61,992 (0.39%)
 Ted Kennedy - 19,805 (0.12%)
 Arthur O. Blessitt - 8,717 (0.06%)
 Lloyd Bentsen - 4,046 (0.03%)

1976 Democratic National Convention (Presidential tally):
 Jimmy Carter - 2,239 (74.48%)
 Mo Udall - 330 (10.98%)
 Jerry Brown - 301 (10.01%)
 George Wallace - 57 (1.90%)
 Ellen McCormack - 22 (0.73%)
 Frank Church - 19 (0.63%)
 Hubert Humphrey - 10 (0.33%)
 Henry M. Jackson - 10 (0.33%)
 Fred R. Harris - 9 (0.30%)
 Milton Shapp - 2 (0.07%)
 Robert Byrd, Cesar Chavez, Leon Jaworski, Barbara Jordan, Ted Kennedy, Jennings Randolph, Fred Stover - each 1 vote (0.03%)

1980 Democratic National Convention (Presidential tally):
 Jimmy Carter (inc.) - 2,123 (64.04%)
 Ted Kennedy - 1,151 (34.72%)
 William Proxmire - 10 (0.30%)
 Koryne Kaneski Horbal - 5 (0.15%)
 Scott M. Matheson, Sr. - 5 (0.15%)
 Ron Dellums - 3 (0.09%)
 Robert Byrd - 2 (0.06%)
 John Culver - 2 (0.06%)
 Kent Hance - 2 (0.06%)
 Jennings Randolph - 2 (0.06%)
 Warren Spannaus - 2 (0.06%)
 Alice Tripp - 2 (0.06%)
 Jerry Brown - 1 (0.03%)
 Dale Bumpers - 1 (0.03%)
 Hugh L. Carey - 1 (0.03%)
 Walter Mondale - 1 (0.03%)
 Edmund Muskie - 1 (0.03%)
 Thomas J. Steed - 1 (0.03%)

References

Byrd, Robert
Robert Byrd